"Get Off" is a song by American rock band The Dandy Warhols. It was released in 2000 as the first single from their third studio album, Thirteen Tales from Urban Bohemia, and was re-released in 2002.

Release 

"Get Off" peaked at No. 38 on the UK Singles Chart in 2000 and No. 34 when it was re-released in 2002.

Reception 

NME wrote that the song sounds like "a thousand Sioux Indians invading the whorehouse at the High Chaparal for a bongs'n'blow jobs toga keg party", commenting "does it really take a major bastard ad campaign for the radio big knobs to spot a decent tune when it chews their fucking faces off?", in reference to The Dandy Warhols' relative obscurity prior to having their song "Bohemian Like You" featured in a Vodafone advert.

Track listing 
All tracks written and composed by Courtney Taylor-Taylor, except where indicated.

Music video

The video was filmed in Portland in April 2000. Scenes of the band members riding horses were filmed on St. Johns Bridge in northwest Portland on April 9th, and scenes of them tethering horses, hanging out in a club, and performing in a room with an American flag background were filmed on April 11th. The bridge scenes had to be filmed very early on a Sunday morning so the bridge closure wouldn't affect traffic or fishermen.

References

External links 
 
 

2000 singles
The Dandy Warhols songs
2000 songs
Capitol Records singles
Parlophone singles
Songs written by Courtney Taylor-Taylor
Song recordings produced by Dave Sardy